Arshad Ali is a Pakistani politician from Charsadda District, who served as a member of the Khyber Pakhtunkhwa Assembly, belonging to the Qaumi Watan Party. He is the brother of former MPA Alam Zeb.

Political career
Ali was elected as the member of the Khyber Pakhtunkhwa Assembly on the Qaumi Watan Party ticket from PK-19 (Charsadda-III) in 2013 Pakistani general election. He also contested the 2018 General Elections but lost to Shakeel Bashir Khan.

References

Living people
Pashtun people
Khyber Pakhtunkhwa MPAs 2013–2018
Qaumi Watan Party politicians
People from Charsadda District, Pakistan
Year of birth missing (living people)